

Joseph Leonard Walsh (September 21, 1895 – December 6, 1973) was an American mathematician who worked mainly in the field of analysis.  The Walsh function and the Walsh–Hadamard code are named after him. The Grace–Walsh–Szegő coincidence theorem is important in the study of the location of the zeros of multivariate polynomials.

He became a member of the National Academy of Sciences in 1936 and served 1949–51 as president of the American Mathematical Society. Altogether he published 279 articles (research and others) and seven books, and advised 31 PhD students.

For most of his professional career he studied and worked at Harvard University. He received a B.S. in 1916 and a PhD in 1920. The Advisor of his PhD was Maxime Bôcher. Walsh started to work as lecturer in Harvard afterwards and became a full professor in 1935. He was an Invited Speaker of the ICM in 1920 at Strasbourg. With two different scholarships he was able to study in Paris under Paul Montel (1920–21) and in Munich under Constantin Carathéodory (1925–26). From 1937 to 1942 he served as chairman of his department at Harvard. During World War II he served as an officer in the US navy and was promoted to captain right after end of the war. After his retirement from Harvard in 1966 he accepted a position at the University of Maryland where he continued to work up to a few months before his death.

Works

Articles
 
 
 with Wladimir Seidel: 
 with T. S. Motzkin: 
 with J. P. Evans: 
 with Lawrence Rosenfeld: 
 
 with J. H. Ahlberg & E. N. Nilson: 
 with J. H. Ahlberg & E. N. Nilson: 
 with J. H. Ahlberg & E. N. Nilson:

Books
 Interpolation and approximation by rational functions in the complex domain, AMS Colloquium Publications 1935, 5th edn. 1969
 The location of critical points of analytic and harmonic functions, AMS Colloquium Publications, vol. 34, 1950
 with John Harold Ahlberg, Edwin Norman Nilson: The theory of splines and their applications, Academic Press 1967,

References

Additional sources 
 
 
 Morris Marden:  Joseph L. Walsh in Memoriam. Bulletin of the American Mathematical Society, Volume 81, issue 1, January 1975
 

1895 births
1973 deaths
20th-century American mathematicians
Harvard University alumni
Harvard University faculty
Members of the United States National Academy of Sciences
Presidents of the American Mathematical Society
Mathematicians from Washington, D.C.